Kwasi Kwarfo Adarkwa, Ph.D is a Ghanaian academic and the a past Vice Chancellor of the Kwame Nkrumah University of Science and Technology (KNUST).  In 2008, he was selected by then President of Ghana, John Kufuor, for a national award in the field of academics.

Early life and education
Adarkwa attended Mfantsipim School for his secondary education certificate. He then obtained his university degree from the Kwame Nkrumah University of Science and Technology. He is a fellow of the Ghana Academy of Arts and Sciences, the Ghana Institute of Planners and the Chartered Institute of Logistics and Transport.

Career

Vice Chancellor of KNUST 
Adarkwa served as the Pro Vice-Chancellor of KNUST, and became Vice Chancellor of KNUST from September 2006 to September 2010. He succeeded Prof. Kwesi Andam. During that time, the university was ranked among the first 100 universities of Africa. KNUST in February 2010 was ranked the 20th best university in Africa. He was succeeded by Prof William Otoo Ellis.

Present life
Adarkwa returned to the Department of Planning, KNUST to lecture at the end of his Vice-Chancellorship. 

His interests in research lie in  urbanisation and growth of human settlements, transportation planning and economics, and  land use planning.

See also 

 Kwesi Andam
 William Otoo Ellis

References

Living people
Vice-Chancellors of the Kwame Nkrumah University of Science and Technology
Mfantsipim School alumni
Year of birth missing (living people)
Vice-Chancellors of universities in Ghana
Recipients of the Order of the Volta
Academic staff of Kwame Nkrumah University of Science and Technology